Ibadan North-West is a Local Government Area in Oyo State, Nigeria. Its headquarters are at Dugbe/Onireke. The postal code of the area is 200.

Demographics
It has an area of 26 km and a population of 152,834 at the 2006 census.

References

Local Government Areas in Oyo State
Ibadan